Deportivo Toluca F.C. is a Mexican football club based in Toluca. The team play in the Liga MX – the highest tier in the Mexican football league system. The club was founded in 1917.

The following is a list of players who have made 100 or more first team appearances for the club. This consists of appearances in Liga MX, Ascenso MX, Copa MX, CONCACAF Champions League, Copa Libertadores, Copa Sudamericana, and their predecessors. Players with fewer appearances are also included if they are a club record holder, or have won a notable individual award with the club.

Players
Statistics correct as of start of 2018–19 season

References
General

Specific

Players
Toluca
 
Association football player non-biographical articles